Salix gooddingii is a species of willow known by the common name Goodding's willow, or Goodding's black willow. It was named for its collector, Leslie Newton Goodding.

Salix gooddingii is native to the southwestern United States and northern Mexico, where it grows in moist and wet habitat in many types of habitat from mountains to desert. It is a common riparian species. The leaves are up to 13 cm long, generally lance-shaped, and finely serrated along the edges. The young leaves are coated in hairs. The inflorescence is a catkin of flowers up to 8 cm long.

References

External links
 
 
 Jepson Manual Treatment
 US Forest Service Fire Ecology
 
 
 

gooddingii
Flora of the Southwestern United States
Flora of Northwestern Mexico
Flora of Northeastern Mexico
North American desert flora
Plants described in 1905